Hexestrol dicaprylate (brand name Taston), or dioctanoylhexestrol, is a synthetic, nonsteroidal estrogen of the stilbestrol group related to diethylstilbestrol that is no longer marketed. It is a long-acting ester of hexestrol.

See also
 Hexestrol diacetate
 Hexestrol diphosphate
 Hexestrol dipropionate

References

Estrogen esters
Octanoate esters
Synthetic estrogens